Cotter may refer to:
Cotter pin (disambiguation), a pin or wedge used to fix parts rigidly together
Cotter (farmer), the Scots term for a peasant farmer formerly in the Scottish highlands
Cotter (surname), a surname (including a list of people with the name)
Cotter, Arkansas, United States
Cotter, Iowa, United States
Mount Cotter, a mountain in California, United States
Cotter River, a river in the Australian Capital Territory

See also
McCotter, a surname
The Cottars, a Canadian musical group
Kotter (disambiguation)
Cottler